Thakurli is a suburb of the Kalyan Dombivli Municipal Corporation in India.
Thakurli is situated between Dombivli and Kalyan. Served by Thakurli railway station, it used to be a British railway colony, and 
one can find old bungalows of railways. It also houses a railway institute and the "Chola Power House" which was a steam based power plant which powered the railway substation nearby.

References

External links 
 Kalyan Dombivali Municipal Corporation

Villages in Thane district
Kalyan-Dombivli